William Abraham Hardee, Jr (August 12, 1954, – July 4, 2011) was former American football defensive back who played professionally in the 1970s and 1980s.

College career
He played college football for Virginia Tech from 1972 to 1975.  Hardee started his collegiate career as a wide receiver, transitioning to defensive back in 1974.  Hardee finished in the Top 10 nationally in 1975, with seven interceptions.  This, along with his work as a kickoff returner, earned him Honorable Mention as an AP All American and a spot on the National Independent All-Star Football squad. Hardee was elected into the Virginia Tech Sports Hall of Fame in 2005.

Professional career
Following graduation from Virginia Tech, Hardee went on to play in the National Football League, the Canadian Football League and the United States Football League.  Hardee retired from professional football in 1985.

After retirement
He worked in the administration department at Lake Region High School in Eagle Lake, Florida.  He and his wife Deborah had three children. A son, Billy III, followed in his father's footsteps and played football for the Hokies from 1999 to 2001.

Death
Hardee died from injuries sustained from a motorcycle accident near Phoenix, AZ. He was in a coma for two days and died shortly thereafter July 4, 2011.

External links

 Virginia Tech Hall of Fame

1954 births
2011 deaths
American football cornerbacks
Calgary Stampeders players
Canadian football defensive backs
Denver Broncos players
New York Jets players
Ottawa Rough Riders players
Toronto Argonauts players
Virginia Tech Hokies football players
American players of Canadian football
Philadelphia/Baltimore Stars players
Road incident deaths in Arizona